Death In June Presents: Occidental Martyr is an album by Death In June released in 1995. It features actor Max Wearing reading the lyrics to Death In June songs over a new soundtrack by Douglas Pearce.

Track listing

Side 1 
 "13 Years of Carrion"
 "Blood of Winter"
 "Lifebooks"
 "Symbols of the Sun"
 "Torture by Roses"
 "Hahahahahahahate"

Side 2
 "Accidental Protégé"
 "Hail! The White Grain"
 "God's Golden Sperm"
 "Symbols of the Sun (Reprise)"
 "Leopard Flowers"
 "Punishment Initiation"
 "Bye"

Death in June albums
1995 albums